The 2002 Kerry Senior Football Championship was the 102nd staging of the Kerry Senior Football Championship since its establishment by the Kerry County Board in 1889. The draw for the opening round fixtures took place on 9 April 2002. The championship ran from 24 May to 10 November 2002.

An Ghaeltacht entered the championship as the defending champions, however, they were beaten by Kilcummin in the semi-finals.

The final was played on 10 November 2002 at FitzGerald Stadium in Killarney, between Kerins O'Rahilly's and Kilcummin, in what was their first ever meeting in the final. Kerins O'Rahilly's won the match by 0-14 to 0-05 to claim their sixth championship title overall and a first title in 45 years.

Declan Quill was the championship's top scorer with 1-27.

Format change

The championship brought a change in format with the introduction of a second chance for defeated first-round teams via a losers' round. The four semi-finalists from the previous year - An Ghaeltacht, Austin Stacks, Dr. Crokes and South Kerry - received byes to the last 16, but did not have the benefit of a second chance. Relegation was also introduced for the club team that lost all their matches.

Results

Round 1

Round 2

Relegation playoff

Round 3

Quarter-finals

Semi-finals

Final

Championship statistics

Top scorers

Overall

In a single game

Miscellaneous

 Kerins O'Rahilly's won a first title in 45 years.
 Kerins O'Rahilly's qualify for the final for the first time since 1963.
 Kilcummin qualify for the final for the first time since 1913.

References

Kerry Senior Football Championship
2002 in Gaelic football